The following is the complete filmography of American actress Judy Greer.

Film

Television

Theatre

References

External links
 

Greer, Judy
Greer, Judy